is a national highway of Japan connecting Bunkyō, Tokyo and Matsumoto, with a total length of .

References

National highways in Japan
Roads in Gunma Prefecture
Roads in Nagano Prefecture
Roads in Saitama Prefecture
Roads in Tokyo